John Francis Albert (March 28, 1915 – August 1, 1989) was Deputy Chief of Chaplains of the United States Air Force.

Biography
Albert was born in Rochester, New York, in 1915. He graduated from St. Bernard's School of Theology and Ministry and was ordained a Roman Catholic priest in 1941. In 1969, he was given the title of Monsignor by Pope Paul VI. He died on August 1, 1989.

Military career
Albert originally joined the United States Army in 1945 before transferring to the Air Force after its inception. In 1970, he was promoted to the rank of brigadier general and became Deputy Chief of Chaplains later that year. He retired in 1972.

Awards he received include the Legion of Merit, the Joint Service Commendation Medal, the Air Force Commendation Medal with oak leaf cluster and the Army Commendation Medal.

References

Military personnel from Rochester, New York
United States Air Force generals
Deputy Chiefs of Chaplains of the United States Air Force
United States Army officers
Recipients of the Legion of Merit
St. Bernard's School of Theology and Ministry alumni
1915 births
1989 deaths
United States Army chaplains
20th-century American Roman Catholic priests